Dom Sahil Krishe de Noronha Tavora (born 19 October 1995) is an Indian professional footballer who plays as a midfielder for Indian Super League club Hyderabad.

Career

Earlier career
Born in Goa, Tavora was a part of both the Brasil Futebol Academia and Sesa Football Academy before signing with Arthur Papas managed Dempo in September 2013.

FC Goa
On 19 August 2016, it was announced that Tavora had signed with Goa of the Indian Super League. He made his professional debut for the team on 8 October 2016 against Pune City. He came on as an 82nd-minute substitute for Mandar Rao Desai.

GDSC Alvarenga
In 2018, Tavora moved abroad and signed with Campeonato de Portugal side GDSC Alvarenga on 1 July.

Hyderabad
In 2019, he came back to India after signing with Indian Super League side Hyderabad. In the 2020–21 season, after having a goalless draw against FC Goa, they narrowly missed the play-offs as they finished 5th in the league table. He scored an important goal in the Final of 2021–22 Indian Super League against Kerala Blasters and lifted the trophy through penalty-shootout.

Career statistics

Club

Honours

Goa Lusophony
 Lusophony Games Gold medal: 2014
Hyderabad FC
Indian Super League: 2021–22

See also
 List of Indian football players in foreign leagues

References

External links 
 Sahil Tavora at Indian Super League

1995 births
Living people
Indian footballers
Indian expatriate footballers
Dempo SC players
Association football midfielders
Footballers from Goa
Indian Super League players
I-League players
FC Goa players
Mumbai City FC players
Hyderabad FC players
Expatriate footballers in Portugal